The 2007 Jacksonville State Gamecocks football team represented Jacksonville State University as a member of the Ohio Valley Conference (OVC) during the 2007 NCAA Division I FCS football season. Led by Eight-year head coach Jack Crowe, the Gamecocks compiled an overall record of 6–5 with a mark of 5–3 in conference  play, tying for third place in the OVC. Jacksonville State played home games at Paul Snow Stadium in Jacksonville, Alabama.

Schedule

References

Jacksonville State
Jacksonville State Gamecocks football seasons
Jacksonville State Gamecocks football